Hatmabad (also Romanized as Ḩatmābād, Hatmābād, and Hotanābād; also known as Khatmābād) is a village in Qahab-e Shomali Rural District, in the Central District of Isfahan County, Isfahan Province, Iran. At the 2006 census, its population was 428, in 119 families.

References 

Populated places in Isfahan County